Pierre Marie Gallois (29 June 1911 – 24 August 2010) was a French air force brigadier general and geopolitician. He was instrumental in the constitution of the French nuclear arsenal, and is considered one of the fathers of the French atom bomb.

Biography 
Gallois was born in Turin, Italy, in 1911 as his parents were travelling. Gallois grew fond of flying as he watched fighters during his childhood through World War I. After studies at Lycée Janson de Sailly and the War School in Versailles, he was made a Sous-Lieutenant in 1936 in a Sahara wing at Colomb-Béchar, and later promoted to Lieutenant the same year. In 1939, he was transferred to the General staff of the Fifth air region in Algiers.

In 1943, Gallois reached Great Britain and joined the only two French heavy bomber squadrons in Royal Air Force Bomber Command as a Halifax bomber crewman at RAF Elvington, near York. He took part in raids against German industries until March 1945.

After the war, Gallois was detached to civil aviation and took part in conferences of the International Civil Aviation Organization. He rejoined the Air Force in 1948 as an aid in the cabinet of the chief of staff of the Armée de l'air. A specialist of equipment and manufacturing, he wrote the quinquennal plan for aeronautic production, which was accepted by the Parliament in August 1950, and studied production plans at the European level. He took part in discussions regarding the use of United States aid in Western Europe.

From 1953 to 1954, Gallois, by then a colonel, was affected to the cabinet of the minister of Defence. He also worked for the Supreme Headquarters Allied Powers Europe at the same time, working on the consequences of the existence of weapons of mass destruction on modern strategy. From 1953, he campaigned for a French nuclear deterrence, stressing the notions of "personal deterrence" and "weak-to-strong deterrence".

Gallois retired from the Army in 1957.

In 2003, he co-founded the Forum pour la France ("Forum for France"), which supports "sovereignty and independence of France". Gallois campaigned against the Treaty establishing a Constitution for Europe.

Gallois was a staunch supporter of Serbia during the Balkan clashes, and one of the main critics of NATO and its role in the Yugoslav crisis.

Gallois died on August 24, 2010 at the age of 99.

External links
 Gallois (Pierre M.) Speeches and Writings
 Les chroniques du général Pierre-Marie Gallois sur le site des Manants du Roi
 Page de la Francosphère Mexique-France

Notes

1911 births
2010 deaths
French generals
Geopoliticians
Members of the Serbian Academy of Sciences and Arts
Foreign members of the Serbian Academy of Sciences and Arts
Royal Air Force personnel of World War II
Lycée Janson-de-Sailly alumni